Edin Husić  (born 10 November 1985) is a Bosnian former professional footballer who played as a forward.

Club career
In 2014 Husić joined FK Sloboda Tuzla. He has spent the latter years of his career in the German lower leagues.

International career
Husić made his debut for Bosnia and Herzegovina in a May 2006 friendly match away against South Korea and has earned a total of two caps (and one unofficial), scoring no goals. His second international was a June 2008 friendly match against Azerbaijan.

References

External links
 
 

1985 births
Living people
Sportspeople from Tuzla
Bosnia and Herzegovina footballers
Association football midfielders
Bosnia and Herzegovina international footballers
Premier League of Bosnia and Herzegovina players
Croatian Football League players
North American Soccer League players
First League of the Federation of Bosnia and Herzegovina players
Oberliga (football) players
Landesliga players
GNK Dinamo Zagreb players
HNK Orašje players
HNK Cibalia players
NK Karlovac players
FK Sarajevo players
NK Zvijezda Gradačac players
San Antonio Scorpions players
FK Sloboda Tuzla players
OFK Gradina players
FK Radnički Lukavac players
FK Mladost Doboj Kakanj players
FC Kray players
Bosnia and Herzegovina expatriate footballers
Expatriate footballers in Croatia
Bosnia and Herzegovina expatriate sportspeople in Croatia
Expatriate soccer players in the United States
Bosnia and Herzegovina expatriate sportspeople in the United States
Expatriate footballers in Germany
Bosnia and Herzegovina expatriate sportspeople in Germany